Stem Stem in Electro is the second album by Canadian band Hrsta. It was recorded in the  Hotel2Tango, Montreal,  by Howard Bilerman, who co-owns the studio with Efrim Menuck and Thierry Amar of Godspeed You! Black Emperor fame.

Track listing
 "...and We Climb" – 6:29
 "Blood on the Sun" – 5:34
 "Quelque chose à propos des raquetteurs" ["Something in Connection with the Racketeers"] – 3:47
 "Folkways Orange" – 5:13
 "Swallow's Tail" – 7:56
 "Heaven Is Yours" – 4:23
 "Gently Gently" – 2:58
 "Une infinité de trous en forme d'homme" ["An Infinity of Holes in the Shape of Man"] – 6:42

Personnel
Eric Craven – drums, vocals
Beckie Foon – cello, vocals
Gen Heistek – viola, vocals
Mike Moya – guitar, piano, organ, vocals
Harris Newman – bass guitar
Sophie Trudeau – violin

2005 albums
Constellation Records (Canada) albums
Hrsta albums
Albums produced by Howard Bilerman